Bordj Emir Abdelkader is a district in Tissemsilt Province, Algeria. It was named after its capital, Bordj Emir Abdelkader.

Municipalities
The district is further divided into 2 municipalities:
Bordj Emir Abdelkader
Youssoufia

Districts of Tissemsilt Province